The following lists events that happened during the 1670s in South Africa.

Events

1670
 2 June - Pieter Hackius is appointed Governor of the Cape Colony

1671
 Land is purchased from the Khoikhoi and the Cape Colony started
 1 December- After the death of Pieter Hackius, Governor of the Cape, a political council is appointed to run the colony with Coenraad van Breitenbach as chairman

1672
 Sugar cane is introduced
 Production of Brandy is started
 23 March - Albert van Breugel is appointed acting Governor of the Cape
 2 October - IJsbrand Godske is appointed Governor of the Cape

1673
 1673 - When negotiations for trade of livestock fails, the Dutch East India Company sends in Hieronimus Cruse to attack the Cochoqua. This is the beginning of Second Dutch-Khoikhoi War in which the Dutch take approximately 1800 head of livestock

1676
 2 January - Johan Bax van Herenthals is appointed Governor of the Cape
 18 February - Two young lions are dispatched from Cape Town to Ceylon as a gift to the king of Kandy

1678
 The settlement of Hottentots-Holland is established
 29 June Hendrik Crudop is appointed acting Governor of the Cape

1679

 26 April The building of the Castle of Good Hope is completed 
 14 October Simon van der Stel is appointed Commander of the Cape
 6 November - Stellenbosch is founded

Deaths
 30 November 1671 - Pieter Hackius dies
 18 January 1677 - Jan van Riebeeck dies at Batavia on Java
 29 June 1678 - Johan Bax van Herenthals dies

References
See Years in South Africa for list of References

History of South Africa